This is the discography of the American ESP-Disk record label, ordered by ID number of each musical album.

ESP 1000 series

1001 Ni Kantu En Esperanto
1002 Albert Ayler – Spiritual Unity
1003 Pharoah Sanders Quintet – Pharoah's First
1004 New York Art Quartet – New York Art Quartet
1005 Byron Allen Trio
1006 Ornette Coleman – Town Hall, 1962
1007 Giuseppi Logan - The Giuseppi Logan Quartet
1008 Paul Bley – Barrage
1009 Bob James – Explosions
1010 Albert Ayler – Bells
1011 Ran Blake –  Ran Blake Plays Solo Piano
1012 Lowell Davidson – Lowell Davidson Trio 
1013 Giuseppi Logan – More
1014 Sun Ra – The Heliocentric Worlds of Sun Ra, Volume One
1015 Milford Graves – Percussion Ensemble
1016 Albert Ayler & Don Cherry – New York Eye and Ear Control
1017 Sun Ra – The Heliocentric Worlds of Sun Ra, Volume Two
1018 The Fugs – The Fugs First Album
1019 Jean Erdman – The Coach with the Six Insides
1020 Albert Ayler – Spirits Rejoice
1021 Paul Bley – Closer
1022 Marion Brown – Marion Brown Quartet
1023 Frank Wright – Frank Wright Trio
1024 Burton Greene Quartet
1025 Patty Waters Sings
1026 Henry Grimes–	The Call
1027 Timothy Leary – Turn On, Tune In, Drop Out
1028 The Fugs -  The Fugs
1029 Charles Tyler - Charles Tyler Ensemble
1030 Sonny Simmons – Staying on the Watch
1031 Noah Howard – Noah Howard Quartet
1032 Sunny Murray – Sunny Murray
1033 (Various Artists)	– ESP Sampler
1034 East Village Other
1035 Tuli Kupferberg – No Deposit, No Return
1036 Byard Lancaster – (NEVER ISSUED)
1037 The Godz – Contact High with the Godz
1038 The Fugs – Virgin Fugs
1039 Randy Burns 	– Of Love and War
1040 Marion Brown 	– Why Not?
1041 Karl Berger 	– From Now On
1042 Gunter Hampel – Music from Europe
1043 Sonny Simmons – Music from the Spheres
1044 Marzette Watts – Marzette Watts and Company
1045 Sun Ra	– Nothing Is
1047 Godz – Godz 2
1048 Alan Sondheim – Ritual-All-7-70
1049 Gato Barbieri – In Search of the Mystery
1050 William S. Burroughs – Call Me Burroughs
1051 (Various Artists)	– ESP Sampler
1052 James Zitro 	– West Coast Music
1053 Frank Wright 	– Your Prayer
1054 Pearls Before Swine. 	– One Nation Underground
1055 Patty Waters 	– College Tour
1056 Movement Soul	– Live Recording of Songs and...
1057 Peter Lemer 	– Local Colour
1058 Sean Gagnier – (never issued)
1059 Charles Tyler – Eastern Man Alone
1060 Steve Lacy – The Forest and the Zoo
1061 Jerry Moore – Ballad of Birmingham (aka Life Is A Constant Journey Home)
1062 Jacques Coursil – Unit (never issued)
1063 New York Electric String Ensemble
1064 Noah Howard – At Judson Hall
1065 Slavonic Cappella Ensemble - Music From The Orthodox Liturgy
1066 Bud Powell – Blue Note Cafe Paris 1961
1067 / ORO 5 HAR-YOU Percussion Group – Sounds of the Ghetto Youth
1068 Holy Modal Rounders – Indian War Whoop
1069 / ORO 1 Bruce MacKay – Midnight Minstrel
1070 / ORO-4	All that the name implies – Side 1
1071 Paul Bley – [never issued double album]
1072 Tony Snell – Fungus and Englishmen Abroad
1073 Norman Howard – Burn, Baby, Burn
1074 Burton Greene Trio - On Tour
1075 Pearls Before Swine – Balaklava
1076 Nedly Elstak – The Machine
1077 The Godz – Third Testament
1078 Seventh Sons – Four AM At Frank's (aka Raga)
1080 Karel Velebný – SHQ
1081 (Various Artists)	– An Evening At Home With ESP
1082 Alan Sondheim	– T'Other Little Tune
1083 Free Music Quintet – Free Music 1 & 2
1085 Lou Killen – Sea Chanteys (aka Folk Songs)
1089 Randy Burns – Evening Of The Magician
1091 Alan Silva – Skillfulness
1092 Ed Askew – Ask The Unicorn
1095 Levitts –	We Are The Levitts
1097 / ORO 6	Todd Kelley – Folksinger
1098 MIJ – Yodeling Astrologer
1099 Erica Pomerance – You Used To Think (aka Surreal)
1111 (Various Artists)	– Boots 'n Roots

Main source:

ESP 2000 series

 2000 Octopus	–	Rock-New Music Fusion
 2001 Cromagnon	– Elliot/Grasmere Connecticut Tribe (aka Cave Rock/Orgasm)
 2002 Jayne County 	– Goddess Of Wet Dreams
 2003 Charles Manson and the Family Sing 13 Songs - Lie: The Love and Terror Cult
 2004 Sweet Pie – Pleasure Pudding: Livid at Fat City
 2004 Sweet Pie – Honky Tonk Jive
 2005 Barry Titus – Do Wappa Do
 2006 Emerson's Old Timey Custard-Suckin' Band	– Emerson's Old Timey Custard-Suckin' Band
 2007 Randy Burns 	– Songs For An Uncertain Lady
 2008 Joel Tobias 	– God Is Watching America
 2009 Barry Titus 	– 42nd Street
 2010 Woodstock Workband – Armed And Dangerous
 2012 Woodstock Band	– Sword In The Hand
 2013 Jimi Lalumia & The Psychotic Frogs – Live At Max's Kansas City 1981
 2015 Don Moore – In The Groove
 2016 Don Moore – Party Goin' On In Woodstock
 2017 Godz - Godzundheit
 2018 The Fugs 	– Fugs 4, Rounders Score
 2020 Les Visible 	– Too Old To Rock And Roll
 2021 Les Visible 	– Jews From Outer Space
 2022 (Various Artists) – ESP-disk Guide To Funky
 2044 (Various Artists) – Woodstock: Moods And Moments
 2051 (Various Artists) – ESP Sampler (promotional only)

Main source:

ESP 3000 series

3000 Charlie Parker – Live Performances
3001 Charlie Parker – Broadcast Performances, Vol. 2
3002 Billie Holiday – Broadcast Performances, Vol. 1
3003 Billie Holiday – Broadcast Performances, Vol. 2
3004 Tony Snell – Medieval & Latter Day Lays
3005 Billie Holiday – Radio & TV Broadcasts (1953-1956)
3006 Billie Holiday – Broadcast Performances, Vol. 4
3007 Revolutionary Ensemble – Vietnam
3009 Tiger Tiger – Sun Country
3010 Captain Matchbox-Wow – Smoke Dreams
3011 Marc Black – Big Dong Dharma
3012 Rolf Kempf – Daydreamer
3013 Frank Lowe – Black Beings
3014 Peter Stampfel & Luke Faust – Wendigo Dwain Story
3015 Nadolski	– New Music From Poland 1 [NEVER ISSUED]
3016 Niemen - Enigmatic – New Music From Poland 2
3017 Lester Young – Newly Discovered Performances 1
3018 Sea Ensemble – We Move Together
3019 Paul Thornton, Les Fradkin & Unger & The Big Band	– Pass On This Side
3019-2 The Godz 	– Godz Bless California
3020 Bill Horwitz –	Lies, Lies, Lies
3021 Bud Powell – Winter Broadcasts 1953
3022 Bud Powell – Spring Broadcasts 1953
3023 Bud Powell – Summer Broadcasts 1953
3023? – New Music From Japan
3024 Bud Powell –	Autumn Broadcasts 1953
3025 Anton Bruhin –	New Music From Switzerland
3026 Ronnie Boykins – The Will Come, Is Now
3028 Michael Gregory Jackson	– Clarity
3029 Sorgen/Rust/Windbiel Trio	– Outlet
3030 Albert Ayler – Prophecy
3031 Albert Ayler – Live At Slug's Saloon Vol. 1
3032 Albert Ayler – Live At Slug's Saloon Vol. 2
3033 Sun Ra –	Concert For The Comet Kohoutek

Main source:

ESP 4000 series

       4001    Albert Ayler   -   Live on the Riviera
       4002    Sun Ra   -   Heliocentric Worlds Vol. 3
       4003    Pearls Before Swine   -   The Complete ESP-Disk' Recordings
       4006    Albert Ayler   -   Bells/Prophecy
       4007    Frank Wright   -   The Complete ESP-Disk Recordings
       4008    Pharaoh Sanders   -   Pharaoh Sanders Quintet
       4025    Albert Ayler   -  Slug's Saloon
       4026    Sun Ra   -   Heliocentric Worlds vol. 1-2
       4028    Frank Wright   -  Unity
	4029	Yma Sumac 	– Recital - Live in Bucharest, Romania 1961
       4030    New Ghost  -  Live Upstairs at Nick's
       4031    Tammen/Harth/Dahlgren/Rosen 
	4032	Don Cherry – Live at Cafe Montmartre 1966
       4033    Norman Howard/Joe Phillips   - Burn Baby Burn
       4034    Various Artists   -   Movement Soul Volume Two 
       4035    Albert Ayler   -   The Hilversum Session 
       4036    Bud Powell    -    Live at the Blue Note Cafe, Paris 1961 
       4037    Sunny Murray – Sunny Murray
       4038    Burton Greene   -   Bloom in the Commune 
       4040    Lester Young   -   Live At Birdland 
       4041    Lindha Kallerdahl   - Gold 
       4042    Alan Roth   -   Inside Out In The Open 
	4043	Don Cherry – Live at Cafe Montmartre 1966, Vol Two
       4044    Yuganaut   -   This Musicship 
       4045    The Holy Modal Rounders   -   Live in 65 
       4046    Totem>   -   Solar Forge 
       4047    Yximalloo   -   Unpop 
       4048    Speed, Cheek, & Leibovici   -   Jugendstil 
       4049    Barnacled   -   Charles 
	4050	Charlie Parker 	–	Bird in Time 1940-1947
       4051    Don Cherry   -   Live At Café Montmartre, Vol Three
       4052    Flow Trio   -   Rejuvenation 
       4053    The Naked Future   -   Gigantomachia 
       4054    Sun Ra   -   Featuring Pharoah Sanders & Black Harold 
       4055    Talibam!   -   Boogie in the Breeze Blocks 
       4056    Joe Morris (guitarist)   -   Colorfield 
       4057    TSIGOTI   -   Private Poverty Speaks to the People of the Party 
       4058    Paul Dunmall & Chris Corsano   -   Identical Sunsets 
       4059    Konitz, Cheek, Furic Leibovici   -   Jugendstil II 
       4060    Sun Ra - College Tour Volume One: The Complete Nothing Is... 
       4061    Eli Keszler - Oxtirn 
       4062    Sun Ra - Heliocentric Worlds 1-3
       4063    Joe Morris - Camera
       4065    Talibam! - Cosmoplitude 7"
       4066    Frank Lowe - The Loweski
       4068    Frank Wright - Blues for Albert Ayler
       4069    Pharoah Sanders - In the Beginning: 1963-64
       4071    Oscar Brown Jr. & Maggie Brown - We're Live
       4072    Various Artists - The Albert Ayler Story
       4073    Bud Powell - Birdland 1953
       4075    Last Exit - Iron Path
       4076    Albert Ayler - Bells/Prophecy
       4111    Various Artists - ESP New Artist Sampler 2008 

Main source:

ESP 5000 series

       5001    Various Artists - Fire Music (sampler)
       5002    Arborea (band) – Fortress of the Sun
       5003    Tiger Hatchery – Sun Worship
       5004    Alan Sondheim	 – Cutting Board
       5005    Extremely Serious Business - Headwall
       5006    John D. Thomas – Serious Business
       5007    The Uppercut: Matthew Shipp Mat Walerian Duo - Live at Okuden
       5008    Defunkt – Live at Channel Zero
       5009    Jungle: Mat Walerian/Matthew Shipp/Hamid Drake – Live at Okuden
       5010    Matt Lavelle/Reggie Sylvester - Retrograde
       5011    Toxic: Mat Walerian/Matthew Shipp/William Parker – This Is Beautiful Because We Are Beautiful People
       5012    Thollem/Mad King Edmund - Happening
       5013    Tiger Hatchery - Breathing in the Walls
       5014    Buck Curran – Immortal Light
       5015    Talibam!/Matt Nelson/Ron Stabinsky - HARD VIBE
       5016    Talibam! - Endgame of the Anthropocene
       5017    The Delegation - Evergreen (Canceled World)
       5018    Matthew Shipp Quartet - Sonic Fiction
       5019    Stephen Dydo/Alan Sondheim - Dragon and Phoenix
       5020    Thollem/DuRoche/Stjames Trio - Live in Our Time
       5021    Amina Baraka & The Red Microphone - s/t
       5022    Matthew Shipp - Zero
       5023    Megumi Yonezawa/Masa Kamaguchi/Ken Kobayashi - Boundary
       5024    Robbie Basho - Live in Forli, Italy 1982
       5025    Fay Victor's SoundNoiseFUNK - Wet Robots
       5026    Whit Dickey - Morph
       5027    Gabriel Zucker - Weighting
       5028    Buck Curran - Morning Haikus, Afternoon Ragas
       5029    Matthew Shipp Trio - Signature
       5030    Mars Williams - Mars Williams Presents An Ayler Xmas vol. 2
       5031    Peter Lemer Quintet - Son of Local Colour
       5032    Painted Faces - Tales from the Skinny Apartment
       5033    various artists - New Improvised Music from Buenos Aires
       5034    Allen Lowe - An Avant-Garde of Our Own: Disconnected Words 1980-2018
       5035    Radical Empathy Trio (Thollem McDonas, Nels Cline, Michael Wimberly) - Reality and Other Imaginary Places
       5036    Ivo Perelman/Matthew Shipp/William Parker/Bobby Kapp - Ineffable Joy
       5037    Mat Walerian/Matthew Shipp/William Parker/Hamid Drake - Every Dog Has Its Day But It Doesn't Matter Because Fat Cat Is Getting Fatter
       5038    Thollem McDonas/William Parker/Nels Cline - Gowanus Sessions II
       5039    Matthew Shipp Trio - The Unidentifiable
       5040    Flow Trio with Joe McPhee - Winter Garden
       5042    Fay Victor's SoundNoiseFUNK - We've Had Enough
       5048    ATTITUDE! - Pause and Effect
       5049    Silke Eberhard & Nikolaus Neuser with Talibam! - This Week Is in Two Weeks
       5050    Owl Xounds Exploding Galaxy (Adam Kriney, Gene Janas, Shayna Dulberger, Mario Rechtern) - The Coalescence
       5051    Raymond Byron (a.k.a. Raymond Raposa) - Bond Wire Cur
       5052    Larry Ochs-Donald Robinson - A Civil Right
       5053    Michael Bisio/Kirk Knuffke/Fred Lonberg-Holm - The Art Spirit
       5054    GULFH of Berlin - GULFH of Berlin
       5055    OPTO S - Human Indictive/Live
       5056    Buck Curran - No Love Is Sorrow
       5057    Alan Sondheim & Azure Carter - Plaguesong
       5059    Matthew Shipp Trio - World Construct
       5060    Bridge of Flowers - A Soft Day’s Night
       5061    Rova Saxophone Quartet - The Circumference of Reason
       5064    East Axis - Cool With That
       5065    Duck Baker - Confabulations
       5066    The Red Microphone - And I Became of the Dark...
       5067    William Parker—Patricia Nicholson - No Joke!
       5068    Eunhye Jeong - NOLDA
       5069    Gabriel Zucker/The Delegation - Leftover Beats from the Edges of Time
       5070    Ivo Perelman & Matthew Shipp - Fruition
       5074    Michael Marcus - Abstractions in Lime Caverns

References

Jazz discographies
Discographies of American record labels